Nigeria is a member of the United Nations. Nigeria did not become independent of the United Kingdom until 1960, while the United Nations had already been established by the Declaration by United Nations in 1942. Tijjani Muhammad-Bande is the permanent representative of Nigeria.

In 2013, Nigeria contributed the fifth largest number of peacekeepers to  United Nations peacekeeping operations. Nigeria has recently served a two-year term from 2014–2015 as a temporary member of the United Nations Security Council. The United Nations helped negotiate adjusting the border of Nigeria and Cameroon resulting in the Greentree Agreement in 2006.

See also 

List of countries by number of UN peacekeepers
List of members of the United Nations Security Council

References

External links 
 Official Website of Nigeria's UN Mission

 
Foreign relations of Nigeria